PIDA is an open source IDE written in the Python language, which is designed to coalesce different software development tools to provide a seamless workflow for programmers. The authors describe this as "a framework for integrated development". PIDA focuses entirely on reusing Gold Standard development tools, and aiming to never reinvent wheels.

Details 
PIDA was originally written in 2005 by Ali Afshar as a graphical environment and shell around the Vim text editor. This was subsequently extended to other embeddable editors as well, including Emacs and Mooedit. The application provides facilities such as project management, parsing of files to access member lists, launching of debuggers and other external programs, such as source control or profilers, depending on the language and platform being used.

Future 
PIDA was succeeded by the Abominade IDE (a8) in 2012.

References

External links 
 Bug tracker at Launchpad
 Mailing list at Google Groups

GNOME Applications
GNOME Developer Tools
Software that uses PyGTK
Free software programmed in Python
Free integrated development environments
Integrated development environments that use GTK